Lahore is a Punjabi Indi-pop single by Guru Randhawa, released by T-Series on 13 December 2017. It is one of the most-streamed songs in India. It has over 1 billion views on YouTube. It was recreated by Sachin-Jigar as ''Lagdi Lahore Di'' from the film Street Dancer 3D (2020), voiced by Guru Randhawa and Tulsi Kumar.

Background

In an interview to IANS, Randhawa said about "Lahore'" that "It's about a girl whom I have referred to from different places like Lahore, Delhi, Mumbai or London. I have compared her to Lahore's beauty, Mumbai's move, London's weather and so on. The beats of the song are peppy."

Asked about how he came up with the idea for the song, he said: "We were travelling by a car when the lyrics and beat came to my mind. It is basically describing a girl's beauty and comparing it to different places of the world." 

The song is named after the city of Lahore, the capital of Pakistani Punjab. However, Randhawa mentioned in a January 2019 interview that he had never visited the city. He said, "I haven't been to Lahore, but we get calls from Pakistan for a music tour. In fact, I sat with my team and we are planning to go to Pakistan."

Music video
The music video is shot mainly at Dubai. It features Randhawa in a modified Dodge Challenger R/T featuring Izabelle Leite. Randhawa is seen to be travelling on the Sheikh Zayed Road.

Reception
It is one of the most-streamed hit songs in India. It was released by T-Series, and has received over 1 billion views on YouTube, becoming the one of the most-viewed music video on the T-Series channel. It is the 3rd most-viewed Punjabi Indi-pop music video on YouTube, and the platform's fourth most-viewed Indian music video, after the songs "Laung Laachi", "Vaaste", and "High Rated Gabru".

Street Dancer 3D version
Lahore renamed for the Street Dancer 3D, Lagdi Lahore Di, sung by Guru Randhawa, Tulsi Kumar.

Charts
It was well-received by audiences and within a month received around 153 million views on YouTube, reaching #17 on the Billboard YouTube charts.
The Song reached No. 2 on the UK Asian Music Charts.

Credits

 Song - Lahore
 Singer - Guru Randhawa
 Cast - Guru Randhawa, Izabelle Leite
 Lyrics - Guru Randhawa
 Background Music - Hassan Ejaz
 Producer - Bhushan Kumar , Hassan Ejaz
 Composer - Guru Randhawa
 Music- Vee Music 
 Video - DirectorGifty
 Mix/Master - Crossflow Recordings (London)
 Choreographer - Amit Syal 
 Costumes - Sheltun Benjamin 
 Music Label - T-Series

References 

2017 singles
Indian pop
Indian songs
Punjabi-language songs
T-Series (company) singles
Guru Randhawa songs
Songs about Lahore
2017 songs